is a passenger railway station in the city of Tondabayashi, Osaka Prefecture, Japan, operated by the private railway company Kintetsu Railway.

Lines

Station layout
The station consists of two opposed side platforms connected to the station building by an underground passage.

Platforms

Adjacent stations

History
Kishi Station opened on April 14, 1898. It was renamed  on January 1, 1919, and then   three weeks late on January 25 of the same year. It reverted to Kishi Station on April 1, 1933.

Passenger statistics
In fiscal 2018, the station was used by an average of 17,226 passengers daily

Surrounding area
Eifuku-ji Temple
Tsuho-ji Temple
 Kishi Elementary School, Tondabayashi City
Kishinishi Elementary School, Tondabayashi City
Tondabayashi Municipal Kishi Junior High School
PL Gakuen Junior and Senior High School

See also
List of railway stations in Japan

References

External links

 Kishi Station  

Railway stations in Japan opened in 1898
Railway stations in Osaka Prefecture
Tondabayashi, Osaka